Zeta Canis Minoris (ζ Canis Minoris) is a solitary, blue-white hued star in the equatorial constellation of Canis Minor. It is a dim star but visible to the naked eye with an apparent visual magnitude of 5.13. Based upon an annual parallax shift of 5.23 mas as seen from Earth, this star is located around 410 light years from the Sun. It is moving away from the Sun with a radial velocity of +32.3 km/s.

This is a B-type bright giant star with a stellar classification of B8 II. It is a Mercury-Manganese star, showing an overabundance of these elements in its spectrum. The star has about four times the mass of the Sun and is radiating 490 times the Sun's luminosity from its photosphere at an effective temperature of 13,500 K.

References

B-type bright giants
Canis Minoris, Zeta
Canis Minor
BD+02 1808
Canis minoris, 13
063975
038373
3059